The Acton swing bridge is a swing bridge spanning the River Weaver in the village of Acton Bridge in north Cheshire, England. First operated in 1933, it carries the A49 trunk road.

History
The bridge is 83.5 m long and 8 m high bowstring truss balanced swing bridge, based on an 1893 design by John Arthur Saner. It has two slightly skew spans of 25 m each, with the twin riveted steel trusses supported on a mass concrete pontoon chamber.

It was built in an open position between 1931 and 1933 at a cost of £52,000, shutting for the first time on 10 August 1933. The current bridge replaced an older stone bridge which had been able to carry only one line of traffic with an axle weight limit of 8 tons (the first bridge across the Weaver at this point was built in 1751). The current bridge is approximately 100 m north (downstream) of the old bridge's abutments, visible on the river banks from the Leigh Arms car park.

It has been subject to periodic strengthening (e.g. in 1987) and repair (e.g. in 2015). Today the structure of the bridge is maintained by the Canal & River Trust; Cheshire West and Chester Council is responsible for maintaining the A49 road which it carries.

See also

Dutton Horse Bridge, a nearby bridge also by Saner

References

Buildings and structures in Cheshire
Swing bridges in England
Bridges completed in 1933
Bridges in Cheshire